The Schibenstoll (or Scheibenstoll) is one of the peaks of the Churfirsten group, located in the Appenzell Alps. It lies between the valley of Toggenburg and Lake Walenstadt in the canton of St. Gallen. The summit is easily accessible by a trail on the northern side.

References

External links
Schibenstoll on Hikr

Mountains of the Alps
Mountains of Switzerland
Mountains of the canton of St. Gallen
Appenzell Alps